The Ground Master 200 Multi-Mission (GM200 MM) family is a series of medium-range radars manufactured by Thales Group. The GM200 MM family features 4D Active Electronically Scanned Array (AESA) technology, which is a ‘dual-axis multi-beam’ technology providing flexibility in both elevation and bearing.

There are two radars within the GM200 MM family:

 The GM200 MM/A (All-in-one) fits in a 20 ft ISO shelter and weighs ten tons. It includes a power generator unit, a 8m mast, and room for 2 workstations with the voice and data radio communications. The GM200 MM/A can be set up in 15 minutes and be operated remotely or locally. The primary missions of the GM200 MM/A are Air Surveillance and GBAD (Ground Based Air Defense) up to MRAD (Medium Range Air Defense).
 The GM200 MM/C (Compact) is suited for Counter Battery and Weapon Locating operations and supports Very Short Ranged Air Defence (V/SHORAD) up to Medium range air defense (MRAD) missions. The radar is deployable in less than 2 minutes.

Both radars are transportable by road, rail or tactical aircraft.

The Ground Master 200 MM is a variant of the Ground Master 200, improving detection of small targets such as Unmanned Aerial Vehicles (UAVs) and Rockets, Artillery and Mortars (RAM).

The GM200 MM is part of the Ground Master family (which includes the GM400α, GM60 and GM200).

Main characteristics

Detection domain 
 Instrumented range: up to 400 km
 Ceiling: up to 100,000 feet
 Elevation coverage: up to 80°

Key Features 
 S-Band
 Electronic Counter Counter Measures (ECCM) capabilities
 Dual Axis Multi-Beam
 Full doppler waveforms
 GaN Technology 
 Cyber protection

Detection performance 
 Air Breathing Targets (ABTs)
 Helicopters (including hovering during pop-up phase)
 Cruise Missiles (CMs)
 Sea surface targets
 Rockets
 Artillery and Mortars (RAM) including Weapon Location and Counter Battery Fire support
 UAV from Class I (Mini) up to Class IV (HALE)

Unit Price 
The unit price for the GM200 MM/C variant is approximately 14.5 million EUR (based on a Danish purchase of five for 540 million DKK in 2022).

References 

Ground radars
Thales Group
Military radars of France